Almarudite (IMA symbol: Alr) is an extremely rare alkaline manganese beryllium silicate mineral of the cyclosilicates (ring silicates) class, with the chemical formula , from the volcanic environment of the Eifel Mountains in Germany.

References

Cyclosilicates
Beryllium minerals
Manganese(II) minerals
Hexagonal minerals